The List of shipwrecks in 1769 includes some ships sunk, wrecked or otherwise lost during 1769.

January

10 January

12 January

15 January

24 January

30 January

Unknown date

February

10 February

Unknown date

March

9 March

10 March

14 March

21 March

Unknown date

April
14 April

20 April

26 April

28 April

Unknown date

May

1 May

6 May

8 May

13 May

17 May

29 May

Unknown date

June

19 June

Unknown date

July

3 July

19 July

20 July

21 July

26 July

August

7 August

Unknown date

September

5 September

16 September

17 September

29 September

Unknown date

October

11 October

20 October

30 October

Unknown date

November

4 November

10 November

11 November

16 November

25 November

27 November

Unknown date

December

4 December

13 December

14 December

22 December

23 December

25 December

28 December

Unknown date

Unknown date

References

1769